Randy Maggard (born July 4, 1963) is an American politician. He is a Republican representing the 38th district in the Florida House of Representatives.

Biography

Maggard was born in Dade City, Florida. He earned an Associate degree from Pasco-Hernando State College in 1983. He and his wife, Colleen, have three children and live in Dade City.

Political career

Maggard was chairman of the Republican Party of Pasco from 2006 to 2012.

In 2019, Maggard ran in a special election to fill the 38th district's seat in the Florida House of Representatives, after former Rep. Danny Burgess was appointed head of the Florida Department of Veterans' Affairs. Maggard defeated David McCallister in the Republican primary with 61.9% of the primary, and won the general election against Democrat Kelly Smith with 55.6% of the vote.

Maggard sits on the following committees:
 Business & Professions Subcommittee
 Health Quality Subcommittee
 Higher Education Appropriations Subcommittee
 Joint Select Committee on Collective Bargaining
 Local Administration Subcommittee

Electoral record

References

Living people
Republican Party members of the Florida House of Representatives
1963 births
21st-century American politicians